The 24th Buil Film Awards ceremony was hosted by the Busan-based daily newspaper Busan Ilbo. It was held on October 2, 2015 at the Haeundae Grand Hotel's Grand Ballroom in Busan and was emceed by actors Kwon Hae-hyo and Cho Soo-hyang.

Nominations and winners
Complete list of nominees and winners:

(Winners denoted in bold)

References

External links 
 

Buil Film Awards
Buil Film Awards
Buil Film Awards
October 2015 events in South Korea